Eastern Production Ltd. was a Hong Kong-based independent company, which specialized in production of films, established in 1991 by martial artist and actor Jet Li, who was also owner of the company.

Films

References

External links 
 Full list of produced films by Eastern Production Ltd. at HKMDB.com

Film production companies of Hong Kong
Cinema of Hong Kong